Croatian Glagolitic or Croatian Glagolitic Script is a style of Glagolitic bookhand used in Croatia. This form of the Glagolitic script is also known as Angular Glagolitic. Some of the letters of the original Glagolitic script are abandoned in the Croatian recension of Church Slavonic: Yer, Yus, and Yery; a new letter Short I was introduced.

After Glagolitic became the main script in Croatia in the 11th and 12th centuries, it experienced a boom in the 13th century due to favorable church and political factors. Intensified literary activity in Croatia in the 13th century led to the formation of a special type of Glagolitic writing – an Uncial (statutory) Glagolitic script.

The 14th century and especially the 15th century are considered a golden age in the Croatian Glagolitic tradition. The sources for the approximate proportions and shape (construction) of the letters in the drawing of the antiqua are the Reims Gospel and several Breviaries from the 14th centuries and 15th centuries. With the proliferation of the Gutenberg press gradually in the 16th century in printed Croatian books, the Glagolitic alphabet was replaced by the Latin alphabet.

This bookhand is originally Croatian, while the alphabet itself was created at the Polychron Monastery and refined at the Preslav Literary School, most probably in the Ravna Monastery. The other main style found is the Bulgarian Glagolitic, also known as the Round Glagolitic Script.

The Institute of Croatian Language and Linguistics has declared February 22 the Day of Croatian Glagolitic and Glagoliticism.

References

Glagolitic script
Croatian language
Western calligraphy